Anna Nagurney is a Ukrainian-American mathematician, economist, educator and author in the field of Operations Management. Nagurney is the Eugene M. Isenberg Chair in Integrative Studies in the Isenberg School of Management at the University of Massachusetts Amherst in Amherst, Massachusetts. Previously, she held the John F. Smith Memorial Professorship of Operations Management at the Isenberg School of Management from 1998 to 2021.

Biography 
She received a BS in Applied Mathematics, an AB in Russian Language and Literature, an ScM in Applied Mathematics, and a PhD in Applied Mathematics, all from Brown University in Providence, Rhode Island. Nagurney's Doctoral Advisor at Brown University was Stella Dafermos. Nagurney has contributed to many different areas of operations research with a focus on network systems from congested urban transportation networks to complex supply chains with applications to food, healthcare, disaster relief, among others. She is the author/co-author of over 220 refereed journal articles and 50 book chapters as well as 15 books. She has given keynote talks in many countries, including the US, UK, Colombia, Sweden, France, Germany, Ukraine, Italy, New Zealand, Canada, among others. She has supervised the doctoral dissertations of 23 PhDs. She has held visiting faculty appointments at MIT, at the Royal Institute of Technology (KTH) in Sweden, at SOWI at the University of Innsbruck, Austria, at the School of Business, Economics and Law at the University of Gothenburg in Sweden, and was a visiting fellow at All Souls College at Oxford University in the UK during the Trinity term in 2016.

She delivered the Omega Rho Distinguished Lecture, Networks to save the world: OR in Action, at the 2018 INFORMS Annual Meeting.  She delivered the IFORS Distinguished Lecture, Human migration networks: How Operations Research can assist with refugees and supply chain labor shortages, at CLAIO 2022, Buenos Aires, Argentina, December 2022.  

She is also a member of the international academic board and the co-chair of the board of directors of the Kyiv School of Economics, Kyiv Ukraine

She is one of the 44 women featured in the book, STEM Gems, by Stephanie Espy. 

Her Google Scholar h-index is 71.

Honors and awards 
 1986 - Kempe Prize in honor of Tord Palander, Umea University, Umea, Sweden
 1988 - NSF Visiting Professorship for Women
 1989 - Samuel F. Conti Faculty Fellowship, University of Massachusetts Amherst
 1991 - NSF Faculty Award for Women
 2000 - Chancellor's Medal, University of Massachusetts Amherst
 2002 - Fulbright/University of Innsbruck Distinguished Faculty Chair in Economics, Innsbruck, Austria
 2005 - Award for Outstanding Accomplishments in Research and Creative Activity, University of Massachusetts  Amherst
 2005 - INFORMS Moving Spirit Award for Chapters
 2005-2006 - Science Fellow, Radcliffe Institute for Advanced Study, Harvard University, Cambridge, MA
 2007 - Fellow of the RSAI (Regional Science Association International)
 2007 - WORMS (Women in Operations Research and the Management Sciences) Award of INFORMS
 2008 - Fulbright Senior Specialist Award in Business Administration - Italy
 2013 - Fellow of INFORMS (Institute for Operations Research and the Management Sciences)
 2014 - University Medal awarded by the University of Catania, Italy
 2016 - INFORMS Volunteer Service Award
 2019 - Fellow of the Network Science Society
 2019 - Constantin Caratheodory Prize, International Society of Global Optimization - ISOGO Prizes
 2020 - Harold Larnder Prize, Canadian Operational Research Society

Publications 
 1993. Network Economics: A Variational Inequality Approach. Kluwer Academic Publishers.
 1996. Projected Dynamical Systems and Variational Inequalities with Applications. With Ding Zhang. Kluwer Academic Publishers.
 1997. Financial Networks: Statics and Dynamics. With Stavros Siokos. Springer.
 1999. Environmental Networks: A Framework for Economic Decision-Making and Policy Analysis. With Kanwalroop Kathy Dhanda, and Padma Ramanujam. Edward Elgar Publishing.
 1999. Network Economics: A Variational Inequality Approach (second edition). Kluwer Academic Publishers.
 2000. Sustainable Transportation Networks'''. Edward Elgar Publishing.
 2002. Supernetworks: Decision-Making for the Information Age. With June Dong. Edward Elgar Publishing.
 2003. Innovations in Financial and Economic Networks. (Editor). Edward Elgar Publishing.
 2006. Supply Chain Network Economics: Dynamics of Prices, Flows, and Profits. Edward Elgar Publishing.
 2009. Fragile Networks: Identifying Vulnerabilities and Synergies in an Uncertain World. With Qiang Qiang. Wiley.
 2013. Networks Against Time: Supply Chain Analytics for Perishable Products. With Min Yu, Amir Masoumi and Ladimer Nagurney. Springer Briefs in Optimization.
 2016. Competing on Supply Chain Quality: A Network Economics Perspective. With Dong Li. Springer.
 2016. Dynamics of Disasters—Key Concepts, Models, Algorithms, and Insights. (Editor). With Illias S. Kotsireas and Panos M. Pardalos. Springer International Publishing AG.
 2018. Dynamics of Disasters: Algorithmic Approaches and Applications, (Editor). With  Illias S. Kotsireas and Panos M. Pardalos. Springer International Publishing Switzerland AG
 2021.  Dynamics of Disasters - Impact, Risk, Resilience, and Solutions, (Editor). With Illias S. Kotsireas, Panos M. Pardalos, and Arsenios Tsokas. Springer
 2023. Labor and Supply Chain Networks'', Springer

References

External Links
Homepage
Homepage of the Virtual Center for Supernetworks
Video of Professor Nagurney
list of media on Anna Nagurney
Braess's visit to UMass–Amherst

American economists
American women economists
Game theorists
Living people
American operations researchers
American people of Ukrainian descent
University of Massachusetts Amherst faculty
American women mathematicians
1950s births
Year of birth missing (living people)
20th-century American mathematicians
Ukrainian mathematicians
Ukrainian women mathematicians
21st-century American mathematicians
21st-century American women scientists
20th-century American women scientists
20th-century women mathematicians
21st-century women mathematicians
Fellows of the Institute for Operations Research and the Management Sciences
Network scientists